Leonard Francis Penn (August 27, 1921 – September 5, 1998 ) was an American actor and director and the father of musician Michael Penn and actors Sean Penn and Chris Penn.

Early life
Penn was born in Lawrence, Massachusetts, the son of Russian-Jewish immigrants Elizabeth (née Melnicoff) and Maurice Daniel Penn (Lithuanian-Jewish family).

Penn served in the United States Army Air Forces during World War II as a B-24 Liberator bombardier with the 755th Bomb Squadron, 458th Bomb Group, stationed in England as part of the Eighth Air Force.

Career
A life member of The Actors Studio, Penn won the Theatre World Award in 1954 for his performance in the play The Girl on the Via Flaminia. He acted in numerous roles in the early years of television. In 1956, he was cast as Mr. Rico in the episode "Ringside Padre" of the religion anthology series, Crossroads. In 1957, he appeared in the episode "One If by Sea" of the military drama series, Navy Log. He was also cast in an episode of Beverly Garland's 1957-1958 groundbreaking crime drama, Decoy. In 1960, he played Cavage in "The Poker Fiend" on Richard Boone's CBS western series, Have Gun – Will Travel. In 1961, he was cast as Tiko in the episode "The World Is Her Oyster" of the ABC adventure series, The Islanders, set in the South Pacific, and appeared in an episode of the ABC crime drama The Asphalt Jungle. He also appeared in another ABC adventure series, Straightaway, which focuses on automobile racing. On March 3, 1961, he co-starred with Peter Falk and Joyce Van Patten in the episode "Cold Turkey" of the ABC legal drama series, The Law and Mr. Jones starring James Whitmore. About this time, he also appeared on Pat O'Brien's ABC sitcom, Harrigan and Son. In the 1961-1962 television season, Penn acted in the CBS crime drama Checkmate in the episode The Button-Down Break and starred as Jerry Green in Gertrude Berg's CBS's sitcom Mrs. G. Goes to College renamed at mid-season as The Gertrude Berg Show.

Penn landed work as a director for many television series, including I Spy, Lost in Space, 
Cannon, Star Trek, Blue Light, Custer, the 1976 western Sara, St. Elsewhere, Kojak, Starsky and Hutch, Cagney & Lacey, Little House on the Prairie, Columbo, Hawaii Five-O, Trapper John, M.D., Hart To Hart, Magnum, P.I. and Father Murphy. In 1983, Penn was nominated for an Emmy Award for Outstanding Directing in a Drama Series for The Mississippi.

Politics
Penn supported the Hollywood trade unions and refused to accuse others to the House Un-American Activities Committee in their investigation of suspected Communist infiltration of the film industry. Penn was subsequently blacklisted, and Paramount refused to renew his contract. As a result, Penn was not able to work as a movie actor. He found acting work in television, but CBS ousted him after receiving an anonymous accusation that he had addressed a Communist political meeting. Barred from acting in film or TV, he became a director.

Filmography

References

External links

Leo Penn as the Internet Off-Broadway Database

1921 births
1998 deaths
Male actors from Massachusetts
American male film actors
American male stage actors
American male television actors
American film directors
American television directors
Jewish American male actors
Deaths from lung cancer in California
Male actors from Los Angeles
American people of Lithuanian-Jewish descent
American people of Russian-Jewish descent
People from Lawrence, Massachusetts
United States Army Air Forces officers
United States Army Air Forces personnel of World War II
20th-century American male actors
Hollywood blacklist
20th-century American Jews
Military personnel from Massachusetts